Marracos is a municipality located in the province of Zaragoza, Aragon, Spain. According to the 2009 census (INE), the municipality has a population of 104 inhabitants. Its Postal Code is 50616

References

External links 
 Marracos in comarca Cinco Villas

Municipalities in the Province of Zaragoza